John Gray (11 November 1801 – 7 April 1859) was a soldier and a New Zealand politician. He came to New Zealand in 1847 in charge of a section of the Royal New Zealand Fencible Corps. He successfully stood for election to the 1st New Zealand Parliament in one of the electorates where most of the population was made up by military staff, the Southern Division. He retired after one term due to ill health in 1855, and died four years later.

Early life and family
Gray was born on 11 November 1801. He was the son of Owen Wynne Gray, who was commissioned as a cornet in the 6th Dragoon Guards in 1791, and his second wife, Elizabeth Philpott. His half-brother, Lieutenant-Colonel George Gray, of the 30th (Cambridgeshire) Regiment of Foot, who was killed at the Battle of Badajoz in Spain, was the father of Sir George Grey.

Military career
Gray was commissioned as a captain in the 40th Regiment of Foot on 6 March 1836. He eventually attained the rank of lieutenant-colonel. The Lieutenant-governor of New Ulster Province, Major-General George Dean Pitt, appointed Gray as resident magistrate on 1 August 1848.

Member of Parliament

He retired due to ill health and did not serve in any subsequent parliaments.

Death
Gray died at his home, Wynnestead, East Tāmaki, on 7 April 1859, aged 57. He was buried at Otahuhu Anglican Cemetery. His wife, Barbara, died on 30 July 1882 and is buried next to him.

References

1801 births
1859 deaths
Members of the New Zealand House of Representatives
New Zealand MPs for North Island electorates
19th-century British Army personnel
Military leaders of the New Zealand Wars
Burials at Otahuhu Cemetery
19th-century New Zealand politicians
40th Regiment of Foot officers